The following is an episode list for the Disney Channel Original Animated Series American Dragon: Jake Long, created by Jeff Goode.

American Dragon: Jake Long tells the story of 13-year-old Jake Long (Dante Basco) who must balance ordinary adolescent transformation with the amazing power and ability to change into the form of a dragon who has to overcome obstacles to protect the magical creatures living in the city. Jake navigates the city with fellow skateboarders Trixie (Miss Kittie) and Spud (Charlie Finn) with help from his maternal grandfather (Keone Young), his Grandpa's gruff sidekick, a magical Shar-Pei named Fu Dog (John DiMaggio) and the love of his life Rose (Mae Whitman).

Series overview

Episodes

Season 1 (2005–06)
Note: All episodes in this season were directed by Christian Roman.

Crossover special (2005)

Season 2 (2006–07)
Note: All main, recurring, and supporting characters have vastly different appearances compared to the first season, as a new hand-drawn animation team and style was brought in order to give the show a sleeker look. The Animation had been provided by Wang Film Productions (14 episodes), Starburst Animation (10 episodes), and Jade Animation (8 episodes).

Lists of American children's animated television series episodes
Lists of Disney Channel television series episodes